The George Enescu International Competition is a music competition for young pianists, violinists, cellists and composers, that takes place in Bucharest, Romania. It has helped launch the careers of many musicians, and among its list of first-prize winners are legendary pianists such as Radu Lupu, the winner in the 1967 edition. Other winners include Spanish pianist Josu De Solaun Soto, Russian pianists Elisabeth Leonskaja, in 1964,  and Dmitri Alexeev, in 1970.

Overview
The competition started in 1958, as part of the George Enescu Festival, and celebrated its first five editions (1958, 1961, 1964, 1967, and 1970) in what was then the Socialist Republic of Romania. It was considered, by the countries of the Eastern Bloc, one of the most prestigious music competitions. Jury members included famous musicians such as Claudio Arrau, Nadia Boulanger, Arthur Rubinstein, Magda Tagliaferro, Guido Agosti, Florica Musicescu, Dmitri Bashkirov, Carlo Zecchi, and Lazar Berman. Probably because of financial circumstances during Ceausescu’s dictatorship, the competition was abandoned in 1970, though it resumed twenty-one years later.

The competition is a member of the World Federation of International Music Competitions in Geneva.

The competition and prize-giving ceremony has historically taken place in the Romanian Athenaeum, with the mayor always traditionally attending.

Prize money
 Cello, Violin and Piano prizes:
 First prize – €15.000
 Second prize – €10.000
 Third prize – €5.000

Composition prizes:
 Prize for symphonic music section – €10.000
 Chamber music section – €7.000
 Prize for originality – €5.000;

Winners

Piano section

Violin section
 Silvia Marcovici (1970)
 Alexandru Tomescu (1999)
 Nemanja Radulovic (2001)
 Valery Sokolov (2005)
 Anna Tifu (2007)
 Jarosław Nadrzycki (2009)
 Stefan Tarara (2014)

References

External links
 

Piano competitions
Culture in Bucharest
Events in Bucharest
Music festivals in Romania
1958 establishments in Romania